Club Sportif Grevenmacher is a football club, based in Grevenmacher, in eastern Luxembourg.

History 

The club was founded in 1909 as  'Stade Mosellan' . The current name of the club,  'CS Grevenmacher' , was adopted in 1919.

During the Nazi occupation of the Second World War, the club was renamed  'FK Grevenmacher' , as part of Gauleiter Gustav Simon's policy of Germanisation. The club's name reverted to  'CS Grevenmacher'  upon liberation in 1944.

1949–50 was the first season in which Grevenmacher played in the top league, the National Division. In 1950–51, the team reached the final of the Luxembourg Cup, but lost to SC Tétange in a replay.

In the 1990s, Grevenmacher established themselves as one of the perennial challengers for trophies. In 1993–94, CS Grevenmacher finished in second place in the National Division, qualifying for the UEFA Cup for the first time. The club's first piece of silverware came in the 1994–95 Luxembourg Cup; in Grevenmacher's fifth cup final, the club beat Jeunesse Esch 1–1, 3–2. Between 1991 and 1992 and 2013–14, when they managed an 8th place finish out of 14, Grevenmacher never finished outside the top half of the table.

In the 2002–03 season, the club won the National Division championship for the first time, and thus qualified for the UEFA Champions League. In the same year, Grevenmacher won the Luxembourg Cup, completing the Double.

In the 2015–16 season, Grevenmacher finished bottom of the table and were relegated to the Luxembourg Division of Honor for the first time since 1984–85.

Honours 

National Division
Winners (1): 2002–03
Runners-up (7): 1993–94, 1994–95, 1995–96, 1996–97, 1999–2000, 2000–01, 2001–02

Luxembourg Cup
Winners (4): 1994–95, 1997-98, 2002–03, 2007–08
Runners-up (4): 1950–51, 1952–53, 1953–54, 1958–59

European competition 

CS Grevenmacher have qualified for UEFA European competition twelve times.

UEFA Champions League
Qualifying round (1): 2003–04

UEFA Cup Winners' Cup
Qualifying round (2): 1995–96, 1998–99

UEFA Cup
Qualifying round (6): 1994–95, 1996–97, 1997–98, 2000–01, 2001–02, 2002–03

UEFA Europa League
Qualifying round (3): 2009–10, 2010–11, 2012–13

The club has never won a tie in European competition.  However, the club has come close on four occasions:
In the 1995–96 Cup Winners' Cup, Grevenmacher beat KR Reykjavík 3–2 in the first (home) leg, but lost 2–0 in Iceland, going out by the narrow margin of 4–3 on aggregate.
In 2000–01, Grevenmacher lost their UEFA Cup first leg against HJK Helsinki 4–1. The club had to win the second leg 3–0 to progress (on away goals). Despite a determined fight-back at home, Grevenmacher won by only 2–0, and were eliminated.
In the UEFA Cup in 2002–03, Grevenmacher played Cyprus' Anorthosis Famagusta.  Another heavy defeat away from home (3–0) saw Grevenmacher requiring a miracle in the second leg. Just as they had two years previously, the Luxembourgish team managed to win, but, again, by the insufficient margin of 2–0.
In the 2010–11 UEFA Europa League first qualifying round, Grevenmacher played Dundalk from the Republic of Ireland. Grevenmacher drew the first leg at home 3–3, but were narrowly defeated 2–1 in the away leg, to lose 5–4 on aggregate.
In the 2012–13 UEFA Europa League first qualifying round, Grevenmacher faced KF Tirana. A 0–0 draw in the first leg at home put the Luxembourg side in a strong position going into the second leg in Albania. However, they lost 2–0.

Grevenmacher has also drawn four games in Europe, against Dinamo Tbilisi in 1996–97 and FK Leotar in the 2003–04 Champions League. The other two draws came in UEFA Europa League home games against Dundalk in 2010–11 (3–3) and Albanian side KF Tirana in 2012–13 (0–0).

Overall, Grevenmacher's record in European competition reads, as of 8 July 2012:

Managers 

 Marc Thomé (June 30, 1994 – June 30, 1997)
 Harald Kohr (1997–98)
 Herbert Herres (July 1, 2001 – Dec 12, 2004)
 Alvaro da Cruz (Nov 12, 2004 – March 20, 2008)
 Claude Osweiler (July 1, 2008 – June 30, 2010)
 Marc Thomé (July 1, 2010–2014)
 Jacques Muller (July 1, 2014–2015)
 Roland Schaak (2015– 2016)
 Marcus Weiss (2016-2017)
 Manuel Peixoto (2017-2018)
 Luc Muller (2018-2019)
 Alvaro da Cruz (2018-2019)
 Erwin Bradasch (2019–Present)

References

External links 
 

Grevenmacher
CS Grevenmacher
Grevenmacher
1909 establishments in Luxembourg